The IBM Somers Office Complex is a complex of five office buildings formerly owned and occupied by IBM in Somers, New York, United States.  Situated on a  campus, the I. M. Pei designed, glass pyramid-topped structures formerly housed the regional headquarters for the IBM corporation.

Begun in 1984, the modernist  complex has been described as a "futuristic fortress".

History

The complex was originally conceived in 1983 following the successful approval of a PepsiCo corporate campus nearby. Constructed between 1984 and 1989, the $200 million complex allowed consolidation of 3,000 employees previously spread among several facilities in the surrounding area.  The complex has overcome initial complaints over excessive water usage and light pollution to become a business fixture in the Somers area.

On September 29, 2016, IBM sold the property to a company called 294 Route 100, LLC (the address of the property) for $31.75M.  The transaction was recorded on October 18, 2016.  At the time of sale, the property was assessed with a full value of $122,150,943 and taxable value of $16,185,000.

On September 20, 2018, Sebastian Capital, what is considered the "landlord" of the place, held a special meeting with the town of Somers Board on approving a plan to renovate the campus into a boarding school. Developer Tim DeScripo says that if the academy be put into real life, it could be "one of the most important and relevant schools in the country and the world."

Somers Songsters
In 2003, Somers Songsters recorded the "IBM One Hundred Percent Club" song, to the tune of "I've Been Working On The Railroad", for the archives at the Somers complex as part of the IBM music reference room effort.

Layout

Approximately 2,000 employees in Global Services, Software, and the Systems and Technology Group occupy  of office space in  hilltop campus consisting of four triangle-shaped main buildings and a central service building, each topped with a glass pyramid.

Awards
In 1990 the Somers complex staff was given IEEE Corporate Innovation Recognition "For the development of the multilayer ceramic thermal conduction module for high performance computers."

See also
Thomas J. Watson Research Center

References

1989 establishments in New York (state)
Buildings and structures in Westchester County, New York
I. M. Pei buildings
IBM facilities
Office buildings completed in 1989
Somers, New York